Gero von Schulze-Gaevernitz (27 September 1901 in Freiburg, Germany – 6 April 1970 in Canary Islands) was a German economist. He became a crucial assistant of Allen Dulles in Europe and was awarded the U.S. Medal of Freedom in 1945 for his skillful negotiations in Ascona, Switzerland, for the surrender of a million Nazi forces in World War II, with specific reference to Italy (Operation Sunrise). He was the son of Gerhart von Schulze-Gävernitz, professor of Political Science at Freiburg University and a member of the Weimar parliament (b. Breslau, Silesia, 25 July 1865 - d. Krainsdorf, Silesia, 10 July 1943). His mother was Johanna Hirsch, (b. Mannheim, Germany, 23 May 1876 - d. Ascona, Switzerland, 1938).
Von Schulze-Gaevernitz had two sisters: Ruth Gaevernitz, a historian; and Margiana von Schulze-Gävernitz, who married entrepreneur and philanthropist Edmund Stinnes.

1901 births
1970 deaths
German diplomats
20th-century  German economists
Recipients of the Medal of Freedom